Kanal is a neighborhood in the city district of Trnje in Zagreb, Croatia. It is located northeast of the intersection of Vukovarska Avenue and Marin Držić Avenue and south of Radnička Road. The population is 1,411 (2011).

References

Neighbourhoods of Zagreb